El más buscado ("The Most Wanted") is a 2014 Mexican crime film, directed and written by José Manuel Cravioto. The film was also released as Mexican Gangster: La Leyenda del Charro Misterioso and is based on the life of Alfredo Ríos Galeana, a real life bank thief, considered the most prolific thief in the history of Mexico. The film stars Tenoch Huerta as Ríos Galeana and shows his assaults, personal relationships and his career singing as a mariachi.

The film is a follow-up of a documentary El Charro Misterioso (2005), and was premiered 2015 Morelia International Film Festival. The film also received eight nominations for the Ariel Awards of 2016 for Best Actor, Original Score, Special and Visual Effects, Art Direction, Cinematography, Costume Design and Makeup.

Cast
Tenoch Huerta as Charro Misterioso / Alfredo Ríos Galeana
Marco Pérez as Comandante
Paola Núñez 
Gerardo Taracena
Rocío Verdejo

Awards and nominations

References

External links
 

2014 films
2014 crime drama films
Mexican crime drama films
2010s Spanish-language films
2010s Mexican films